Follo og Nordre Østfold District Court is a district court located in Innlandet county, Norway. This court is based at two different courthouses which are located in Ski and Mysen. The court serves the eastern part of the county which includes cases from nine municipalities. The court in Ski accepts cases from the municipalities of Enebakk, Frogn, Nesodden, Nordre Follo, Vestby, and Ås. The court in Mysen accepts cases from the municipalities of Indre Østfold, Marker, and Skiptvet. The court is subordinate to the Eidsivating Court of Appeal.

The court is led by a chief judge and several other judges. The court is a court of first instance. Its judicial duties are mainly to settle criminal cases and to resolve civil litigation as well as bankruptcy. The administration and registration tasks of the court include death registration, issuing certain certificates, performing duties of a notary public, and officiating civil wedding ceremonies. Cases from this court are heard by a combination of professional judges and lay judges.

History
This court was established on 26 April 2021 after the old Follo District Court and Heggen og Frøland District Court were merged into one court. The new district court system continues to use the courthouses from the predecessor courts. When the court was created, the Storting also approved moving these areas from the Borgarting Court of Appeal to the Eidsivating Court of Appeal. This change was not carried out immediately, however, but on 1 March 2022 the change was officially enacted.

References

District courts of Norway
2021 establishments in Norway
Organisations based in Mysen